Peter Murray is an American sports business executive, best known for being the chief executive officer of the Professional Fighters League.

Career
After college, Murray decided to pursue a career in marketing, securing roles at advertising firms Young & Rubicam and Bates USA. In 1995, Murray joined the National Football League, eventually transitioning to the roles of SVP of business & content development and SVP of global brand partnerships. In 2009, he left the NFL to join talent agency William Morris Endeavor as EVP of marketing & new business.

In 2012, Murray left to co-found sports marketing firm Insignia Sports, where he served as CEO. In 2014, Murray left the agency, which was sold to RSE Ventures, a private investment fund run by Miami Dolphins owner Stephen Ross and former New York Jets executive Matt Higgins. Murray went to sports apparel company Under Armour, after being recruited by CEO Kevin Plank, where he became the brand’s first VP of global brand and sports marketing. At Under Armour, Murray was responsible for signing deals with athletes like Stephen Curry and Clayton Kershaw.

In January 2018, Murray was appointed CEO of the Professional Fighters League. Since his appointment, he has increased the audience and viewership of PFL and signed brand partnerships with companies like Anheuser-Busch, Geico, DraftKings, and the US Marines and with streaming partnerships with ESPN and NBC Sports Group.

Personal life
Murray was born in the Bronx, New York.

References

Year of birth missing (living people)
Living people
21st-century American businesspeople
American chief executives of professional sports organizations
Professional Fighters League
National Football League executives
American marketing businesspeople
Businesspeople from New York City
People from the Bronx